Alain Lestié is a French painter and writer, born in Hossegor in 1944, who lives and works in Cannes and in Paris.

Since the end of the 1960s, Alain Lestié's work has been a reflection on the critical dimension of painting.

Recent exhibitions 
2022

 "Scattered Moments" Topic Gallery, Saint-Raphaël until May 12
 "Detached Stances" Depardieu Gallery, Nice
2021

 "from time to time" GaG Gallery, Bordeaux

 "3 times the measure" (B.Maire): Galerie Meessen De Clercq, Brussels

References

External links 
 The personal works of Alain Lestié
 alain.lestie.free.fr
 http://www.artmajeur.com/lestie/

1944 births
Living people
20th-century French painters
20th-century French male artists
French male painters
21st-century French painters
21st-century French male artists
People from Landes (department)